The American Medical Women's Association (AMWA) is a professional advocacy and educational organization of women physicians and medical students. Founded in 1915 by Bertha Van Hoosen, the AMWA works to advance women in medicine and to serve as a voice for women's health. The association used to publish the Journal of the American Medical Women's Association; the Journal of Women's Health is now the official journal of the AMWA.

Honors
The AMWA honors women physicians each year with four awards.
 The Elizabeth Blackwell Medal, named for Elizabeth Blackwell, the first woman awarded an M.D. from an American medical school, is granted to "a woman physician who has made the most outstanding contributions to the cause of women in the field of medicine."
 The Bertha Van Hoosen Award, named in honor of the Founder and first President of AMWA, honors "a woman physician who has demonstrated exceptional leadership and service to AMWA."
 The Lila A. Wallis Award, named for one of AMWA’s Past Presidents, is given to an individual whose lifetime achievements and values reflect those of Wallis.
 The Woman in Science Award is given to a woman physician who "has made exceptional contributions to medical science, especially in women’s health."

The AMWA also established The International Women in Medicine Hall of Fame to recognize contributions made by women in the medical profession.  The more than two dozen inductees include the first woman physician, Elizabeth Blackwell; and two former Surgeon Generals of the United States Antonia Novello and Joycelyn Elders.  In 2010, the inductees were Linda A. Randolph, president and CEO of the Developing Families Center, an innovative model for healthcare delivery to poor families; and Diana Zuckerman, a health policy expert who is president of the National Research Center for Women & Families.  The latter is the first non-physician inducted.

Publications
The AMWA has published a number of books, primarily in the field of women's health.

References

External links
 
 

Medical associations based in the United States
Organizations for women in science and technology
Organizations established in 1915
Medical and health organizations based in Pennsylvania
Women in medicine